Stegastes arcifrons, the island major or Galapagos gregory, is a damselfish of the family Pomacentridae native to the eastern Pacific Ocean. Its range extending from Costa Rica to the Cocos Islands, Malpelo Island, and the Galapagos Islands. It is common in many parts of its range, and its population appears to be stable. No particular threats have been identified, and the IUCN rates it as being of "Least Concern".

References

arcifrons
Fish described in 1903
Taxa named by Robert Evans Snodgrass
Taxa named by Edmund Heller